National Route 324 is a national highway of Japan connecting the cities of Nagasaki and Uki, Kumamoto, with a total length of 84.4 km (52.44 mi).

References

324
Roads in Kumamoto Prefecture
Roads in Nagasaki Prefecture